The Republic of China national identification card, commonly known as the national identification card of Taiwan, is a compulsory identity document issued to people who hold both nationality and household registration in Taiwan. The National Identification Card served as the evidence for the household registration in Taiwan which grants the holder the right of abode and full civil and political rights in Taiwan. The card is used for virtually all other activities that require identity verification within Taiwan such as opening bank accounts and voting. 

Despite the name mentioning "national", not all nationals regulated by Taiwanese nationality law are eligible to apply for an ID card. Nationals without household registration is not qualified for an ID card. These people, mainly overseas Taiwanese or overseas Chinese, are only eligible to apply for a Taiwan passport. They will need to apply for an Exit & Entry Permit or Resident Certificate if they want to perform short-term visit or long-term residency in Taiwan respectively.

Eligibility
The National Identification Card is issued to nationals with household registration in Taiwan who are 14 years and older. Establishing household registration in Taiwan is required for a national over 14 years of age to possess a National Identification Card. In Taiwanese laws, household registration has close ties to exercise civil and political rights like a citizen. The Taiwanese laws makes a distinction between "registered nationals" and "unregistered nationals", with the former having the right of abode, right to vote, and other benefits of citizenship, while the latter are subject to deportation from Taiwan and need an entry permit to visit Taiwan. While "registered nationals" are entitled to hold the National Identification Card, "unregistered nationals" may only hold the Taiwan Area Resident Certificate. Both groups are eligible to hold the Taiwan passport. The Taiwan Area Resident Certificate is nearly identical to the Alien Resident Certificate (ARC) held by foreign residents in Taiwan.

Children under the age of majority in Taiwan (20 years of age) may establish household registration as long as they have direct lineal relatives with household registration. For adult "unregistered nationals" to become "registered nationals", and thus eligible for a National Identification Card, they must reside in Taiwan for a certain period of time, during which they will hold a TARC instead of an ID Card. Currently, for "unregistered nationals" who have direct lineal relatives who are "registered nationals" (e.g. overseas-born Taiwanese) and foreigners who have naturalized as ROC nationals, this period is (1) continuously for one year, (2) 270 days per year for two years, or (3) 183 days per year for five years.

Usage
The Identification Card contains the holder's photo, ID number,
Chinese name, and (Minguo calendar) date of birth. The back of the card contains more detailed information, including the person's registered address where official correspondence is sent, as well as the names of his/her legal ascendant(s). If the person moves, he/she must re-register at a municipal office.

Unlike the Republic of China passport which can be issued overseas at Taipei Economic and Cultural Offices and ROC embassies and consulates, the National Identification Card is only issued in Taiwan at district, municipal, and township offices. Male dual passport holders who register for household registration and the Identification Card also become eligible for military conscription within the Republic of China, unless the person has overseas resident status.

Possession of the Identification Card is required to obtain the People's Republic of China's Taiwan Compatriot Permit for entry into Mainland China. Most countries granting visa-free entry for ROC passport holders require that the passport holder also possess a National Identification Card. Those without National Identification Cards (e.g. "unregistered nationals") will have the National Identification Card field blank in their passports.

Identity card number
Every citizen (and every foreign resident on their Resident Certificate) has a unique ID number. A valid National Identification number consists of one letter and nine digits. The initial letter depends on the place of one's first household registration for citizens and the city where one first registered residence for foreign residents. The first digit depends on sex; 1 for male citizens, 2 for female citizens, 8 for male foreign residents, and 9 for female foreign residents. The last digit is a checksum.

The letter usage is as follows:

See also
 Identity document
 List of national identity card policies by country
 Household registration in Taiwan
 Taiwan passport
 Resident Certificate

Government of Taiwan
Taiwan